Kawin Thamsatchanan (born 26 January 1990) is a Thai professional footballer who plays as a goalkeeper for Thai League 1 club Muangthong United and the Thailand national team.

Club career

Rajpracha 
Kawin Thamsatchanan was born on 26 January 1990 in Bangkok, Thailand. He began his youth career in 2006 with Raj Pracha, making his senior debut with the team in 2007.

Muangthong United 
In 2008, defending Thai division 2 champions Muangthong United signed Kawin at the age of 18. In his first season with Muangthong United, he secured his first-team status and helped the club win the division 1 title that season. After Muangthong's promotion to the Thai Premier League for the 2009–2010 season, Kawin led the team to win the top division title two years in a row, 2009 and 2010.

In October 2010, Bryan Robson, a Manchester United legend and Thailand's national team head coach at the time, spoke to United's goalkeeping coach, Eric Steele, suggesting he take a look at Kawin. However, Kawin broke his wrist, causing him to be out of action for months, ending his hopes of going on trial at Manchester United.

At the start of the 2013 season, while competing in the 2013 Lunar New Year Cup, Kawin collided against Chris Dickson. He suffered a broken shin, which kept him out for 7 months. After returning to the pitch in the second leg of the Thai Premier League, he dislocated his shoulder and tore ligaments in a match against TOT S.C., ending his season.

Kawin was named man-of-the-match against Johor Darul Ta'zim in the 2016 AFC Champions League knock-out stage semifinal round. He saved all three of Johor's spot kicks in the penalty shootout.

OH Leuven
In 2018, Kawin completed his move to Europe by joining OH Leuven in the Belgian First Division B on a five-year contract. The deal was formally announced on January 10, 2018. Kawin, who wore the number 16 jersey, quickly became Leuven's first-choice goalkeeper, a position previously held by Nick Gillekens. After an outstanding performance in a 1-1 draw against Beerschot Wilrijk, Kawin was named in the Proximus League's Matchday 27 team of the week along with teammate Jarno Libert. In October 2018, Kawin suffered a foot injury which has kept him on the sidelines for months, allowing Laurent Henkinet to take up the position as first-choice goalkeeper. While Gillekens' contract was not prolonged after the 2018-19 season, OH Leuven signed international goalkeeper Darren Keet, who has since become the second choice goalkeeper behind Henkinet, bumping Thamsatchanan into third.

Hokkaido Consadole Sapporo
On 4 February 2020, it was announced that Kawin had joined club Hokkaido Consadole Sapporo on a season-long loan deal. He would eventually not play a single match for the team and returned to OH Leuven at the end of 2021.

Return to OH Leuven
Meanwhile at OH Leuven, the goalkeeper situation had changed completely: both Laurent Henkinet and Darren Keet had left the club and two new goalkeepers had been signed mid-2020: Rafael Romo and Daniel Iversen. With Iversen returning to Leicester City due to lack of playing time, only Romo and youngster Oregan Ravet remained and Thamsatchanan was soon promoted back to second goalkeeper behind Romo. On 11 April 2021 in the penultimate game of the season, after Rafael Romo got injured during the game against Cercle Brugge, Thamsatchanan was brought on as a replacement at half-time, making him the first Thai football player to play in the Belgian highest division. It would prove to be his only match that season, as Romo returned to play the final match of the season. During the 2021 summer transfer window, OH Leuven loaned Rúnar Alex Rúnarsson, demoting Thamsatchanan back to third goalkeeper (together with Ravet). Thamsatchanan did not appear on the match sheet in any match during the first half of the 2021–22 season and being deemed surplus, he was first allowed to join the Thailand national football team to compete the AFF Championship towards the end of 2021, a tournament which was won and in which he played (part of) the first leg of the final. Subsequently, he was loaned out on 4 January 2022, when it was announced that Kawin had joined club Port on a loan deal.

Return Thai league with Port
Upon joining Port, Kawin was given the shirt number 1. In the 2021-22 Thai League 1, he played 7 appearances for the club.

Back to Muangthong United
On 9 August 2022, it was announced that Kawin has back joined club Muangthong United, along with wearing shirt number 26.

International career
Kawin had debut his first senior caps in 2010 King's Cup against Singapore at Nakhon Ratchasima province. Recently, under the management of Winfried Schafer, Kawin has been dropped to a substitution of Sintaweechai Hathairattanakool. He was the starting goalkeeper of the tournament in the 2012 AFF Suzuki Cup.

He represented Thailand U23 in the 2013 Southeast Asian Games. Kawin was the flag bearer for Thailand in the 2014 Asian Games, and was the captain of Thailand U23 in the tournament. Kawin was one of the overaged players playing in the 2014 Asian Games.

Kawin was part of Thailand's squad that won the 2014 AFF Suzuki Cup.

In December 2018, it was announced that Kawin would be part of the Thailand that would compete in the 2019 AFC Asian Cup. However, due to an injury, he sustained in October while playing for OH Leuven, Kawin was forced to withdraw just 2 weeks prior to the tournament. He came back in the drawn match against Vietnam.

Personal life

He attended Assumption College Thonburi for high school and graduated from Assumption University with a bachelor in Business Administration. In September 2013, V. Vachiramethi, a famous Thai monk, advised him to add two Thai alphabets to his name, therefore Kawin decided to change his name from กวิน to กวินทร์. His new name means a great and powerful man. Despite the change of his name, the pronunciation of the word remains unchanged.

Kawin is good friends with Panupong Wongsa and his idols are Oliver Kahn and former Thailand goalkeeper Sinthaweechai Hathairattanakool. Kawin is a Buddhist.

Career statistics

Honours

Rajpracha
 Khǒr Royal Cup: 2007

Muangthong United
 Thai League 1: 2009, 2010, 2012, 2016
 Thai League 2: 2008
 Kor Royal Cup: 2010
 Thai League Cup: 2016

Thailand
 AFF Championship: 2014, 2016, 2020 
 King's Cup: 2016, 2017

Thailand U-23
 Sea Games gold medal: 2013; silver medal: 2021

Individual
 ASEAN Football Federation Best XI: 2013

Royal decoration 
 2015 -  Silver Medalist (Seventh Class) of The Most Admirable Order of the Direkgunabhorn

References

External links
 
 
 Kawin Thamsatchanan profile at Muangthong United website
 

1990 births
Living people
Kawin Thamsatchanan
Kawin Thamsatchanan
Kawin Thamsatchanan
Expatriate footballers in Belgium
Association football goalkeepers
Kawin Thamsatchanan
Kawin Thamsatchanan
Oud-Heverlee Leuven players
Hokkaido Consadole Sapporo players
Kawin Thamsatchanan
Belgian Pro League players
Challenger Pro League players
Kawin Thamsatchanan
Kawin Thamsatchanan
J1 League players
Kawin Thamsatchanan
Kawin Thamsatchanan
Footballers at the 2010 Asian Games
Footballers at the 2014 Asian Games
Kawin Thamsatchanan
Southeast Asian Games medalists in football
Kawin Thamsatchanan
Competitors at the 2013 Southeast Asian Games
Kawin Thamsatchanan
Expatriate footballers in Japan
Kawin Thamsatchanan
Competitors at the 2021 Southeast Asian Games
Kawin Thamsatchanan